The Trio for Violin, Horn and Piano by György Ligeti was completed in 1982. The piece was a turning point in Ligeti’s career. Ligeti had composed little since he completed his opera, Le Grand Macabre, in 1977, having only finished a few smaller pieces, like Hungarian Rock (chaconne) and Passacaglia ungherese for harpsichord. Influenced by sources as diverse as sub-Saharan African drumming, the music of Conlon Nancarrow, and the piano music of Chopin and Schumann, the Trio is considered to be the watershed moment that opened up his "third way," a style that Ligeti claimed to be neither modern nor postmodern.

Ligeti wrote the Trio at the suggestion of pianist Eckart Besch as a companion to Johannes Brahms' Horn Trio, one of the few other examples in the genre, which is why the Ligeti Trio is marked Hommage à Brahms. Ligeti recalled his reaction to the suggestion: "[a]s soon as he pronounced the word 'horn' somewhere inside my head I heard the sound of a horn as if coming from a distant forest in a fairy tale, just as in a poem by Eichendorff."

Analysis
The Trio is in four movements:

A performance of the piece lasts about 21 minutes.

The composition explores the use of major and minor harmonies as free sonorities without following established patterns of common practice tonality. In addition, it explores the natural just intonation of the upper partials available on the horn, asymmetric Bulgarian rhythms in the second movement, and the Ligeti lamento motif in the fourth movement. The first three movements are each in a ternary form – a notable look back towards traditional forms. The final movement is an example of a passacaglia using as its ground bass a similar theme as that of the opening movement. It has been pointed out that the opening theme of the first movement is reminiscent of the opening theme of Beethoven's Piano Sonata No. 26, "Les Adieux".

See also
 Trio for horn, violin, and piano (Banks)
 Trio for horn, violin, and piano (Berkeley)
 Horn Trio (Holbrooke) - An early 20th Century work inspired by the Brahms Horn Trio.

References

Further reading
 Bae, Jae-hyi (배재희). 2009. "리게티의 후기음악에서의 리듬구조 연구" [Rhythmic Structure in the Late Music of György Ligeti]. Ihwa eum'ag nonjib/Ewha Music Journal 13, no. 2:113–37.
 Delaplace, Joseph. 2004. "Le jeu de la mémoire et de l'invention dans le Trio pour cor, violon et piano de György Ligeti". Musurgia: Analyse et pratique musicales 11, no. 3 (Musique et pouvoir): 73–99.
 Dibelius, Ulrich. 1984. "Ligetis Horntrio". Melos 46, no. 1:44–61.
 Diederichs-Lafite, Marion (ed.). 1993. "Tag des Musikgesprächs". Österreichische Musikzeitschrift 48, no. 12 (December): 621–39.
 Josel, Seth F. 2006. "Vertikaler und horizontaler Raum: Tonhöhen- und Intervallbeziehungen im dritten Satz Alla marcia von György Ligetis Horntrio". MusikTexte: Zeitschrift für Neue Musik, no. 111:61–63.
 Taylor, Stephen A. 2004. "Passacaglia and Lament in Ligeti's Recent Music".  Tijdschrift voor muziektheorie 9, no. 1 (February): 1–11.
 Thelander, Kristin. 1999. "György Ligeti's Trio". The Horn Call: Journal of the International Horn Society 30, no. 1 (November): 43–46.

External links

Listening
Recording Horn Trio: Andantino con tenerezza – Helen Kim, violin; Robert Patterson, horn; Adam Bowles, piano Luna Nova New Music Ensemble
Recording Horn Trio: Vivacissimo molto ritmico – Helen Kim, violin; Robert Patterson, horn; Adam Bowles, piano Luna Nova New Music Ensemble
Recording Horn Trio: Alla Marcia – Helen Kim, violin; Robert Patterson, horn; Adam Bowles, piano Luna Nova New Music Ensemble
Recording Horn Trio:  Lamento Adagio – Helen Kim, violin; Robert Patterson, horn; Adam Bowles, piano Luna Nova New Music Ensemble

Compositions by György Ligeti
Ligeti
Ligeti
1982 compositions